Line 5 of Zhengzhou Metro is a rapid transit line in Zhengzhou that runs in a loop around the city center. It is the only loop-line planned in the Zhengzhou Metro system. The line opened on 20 May 2019.

This line is the first rapid transit line to use the "A size" trains in Zhengzhou. "A size" trains are longer and have larger capacity than "B size" trains, which are used on other operational lines of Zhengzhou Metro.

History
Construction of this line began on 18 December 2014. Trial operations (without passengers) started from 29 December 2018 and formal operations started on 20 May 2019. An infill station, Jingbeierlu station opened on 15 May 2021.

Incidents

On July 20, 2021, parts of the line was flooded during the 2021 Henan floods. Rainwater filled a subway classification yard, which was located within a goods station 2.8 km away from the distressed site and connected to the mainline between Haitansi station and Shakoulu station with a branch tunnel, and eventually broke the water-resistant retaining wall between the yard and the connection part, flooding into the mainline tunnel and a train was trapped around 18:00. The conductor tried to operate the train back to the previous station but failed due to the activated ATS device. The water level in the car rose from the ankle to the position of chest, and the passengers, including children, elders and women in pregnancy, stranded in the car were trapped as the symptom of hypoxia and hypothermia began to appear while the flood outside and within preventing them from leaving. One passenger in the fore part of the train, where the water level was lower, broke the window glass to let the oxygen flow inward, by doing which the severe oxygen-lacking situation inside the carriage was relieved shortly before they were rescued. Four hours later, rescuers managed to make a hole on the ceiling of the train and the trapped people, especially those who were in danger, were able to leave the carriage. Then they got out of the tunnel in a row through the emergency evacuating platform alongside the subway rail. Rescuers were able to evacuate 500 people from the train, but 14 were killed. Line 5 reopened on September 15.

Stations

References

 
Railway lines opened in 2019
2019 establishments in China
Zhengzhou Metro lines
Railway loop lines